Blowing Rock is a town in Watauga and Caldwell counties in the U.S. state of North Carolina. The population was 1,397 at the 2021 census.

The Caldwell County portion of Blowing Rock is part of the Hickory–Lenoir–Morganton Metropolitan Statistical Area, while the Watauga County portion is part of the Boone Micropolitan Statistical Area.

History 
Before 1752, when Bishop August Gottlieb Spangenberg of the Moravian Church visited the Blowing Rock, the windy cliffs of the area were home to the Cherokee and the Catawba Native American tribes.

After the mid-18th century, when hardy Scots-Irish pioneers began to settle in the region, the mountain passes from southern Virginia into Kentucky attracted many colonists, farmers, hunters, and trappers who continued south to the mountains of North Carolina. The first family to settle in Blowing Rock were the Greenes, who were established by the mid-19th century on a site that would become the Green Park Hotel property.

Other early settlers in Blowing Rock included the Hayes, Coffey, Bolick, Estes and Storie families. During the American Civil War the mountains of North Carolina often witnessed fierce guerrilla warfare between groups of pro-Confederate and pro-Union fighters. To keep their families safe, men leaving for service in the Confederate Army often sent them to Blowing Rock, which became a local refuge from the fighting.

After the Civil War many of these veterans would join their families and remain in the Blowing Rock area. At the same time, summer residents began to come up from the nearby city of Lenoir to enjoy the cool fresh air and magnificent mountain views. Seeing the potential of their village to become a haven for well-to-do tourists, the residents of Blowing Rock had their village incorporated into a town on March 11, 1889. The town's first mayor was "Uncle" Joe Clarke, and the town initially had a population of about 300.

As word traveled to other parts of the South about the merits of Blowing Rock, more visitors began to arrive, first camping out, and later taking rooms at boarding houses such as the Hayes and Martin houses on Main Street. Eventually there were more visitors than the existing boarding houses could handle, and so many homes were turned into hotels. The first hotel in Blowing Rock was the Watauga Hotel, built in 1884; the hotel added cottages in 1888. The Green Park Hotel opened in 1891, followed eight years later by the Blowing Rock Hotel. Walter Alexander, a prominent local resident, touted the clean air and healthy environment of Blowing Rock; in 1922 he opened his own hotel, called Mayview Manor.

As the tourist economy became Blowing Rock's main industry in the late 19th century, the town was forced to adapt to meeting the needs of tourists. The need for cleaner and better streets (most streets then were simply dirt tracks) led to the paving of the town's streets and highways. Another issue involved the need to build fences to keep farm animals from wandering into town and disturbing visitors - at the time most farms in the area were not fenced. In 1896 the town passed an ordinance which required local farmers to fence in their livestock.

The introduction of the automobile and improved roads early in the 20th century further eased the journey to Blowing Rock, and visitors began to arrive from as far away as Florida. Today Blowing Rock remains a tourist destination for visitors from all over the United States. Due to the town's well-to-do, out-of-state summertime residents, Blowing Rock has restaurants, hotels, golf courses, and other attractions. A recent priority for Blowing Rock's residents has been to preserve and protect the town's historic structures and maintaining the small-town charm and scenery that has attracted so many people for the last 150 years.

In addition to the Green Park Inn, the Bollinger-Hartley House, East Tennessee and Western North Carolina Railroad Locomotive No. 12, Gragg House, Green Park Historic District, Randall Memorial Building, Former, Vardell Family Cottages Historic District, Westglow, and Moses Cone's Flat Top Manor are listed on the National Register of Historic Places.

Saint Elizabeth Catholic Church (Boone, NC), operates the Church of the Epiphany as a seasonal, mission church in Blowing Rock.

Geography

Blowing Rock is located in southern Watauga County at  (36.129663, -81.672566), in the Blue Ridge Mountains. The southernmost portion of the town, including the actual Blowing Rock cliff, is located in Caldwell County.

The town is located on the crest of the Blue Ridge. Most of the town lies just north of the crest, with waters draining north to the Middle Fork of the New River and thence to the Ohio River valley, while to the south of the ridgecrest, waters flow via the Johns River to the Catawba River valley and eventually to the Atlantic Ocean in South Carolina.

Climate 
The climate in the area can be described as warm-summer humid continental (Dfb), or highland subtropical climate (Cfb) depending on the isotherm used; Köppen Climate Classification. Daytime temperatures in the summer infrequently rise above . Temperatures in the winter are much colder and harsher than what would be expected in a southern state, being more similar to southern coastal New England. Daytime highs can frequently fall into the 20s or lower. Snow, sleet, and freezing rain are all common in the winter months. Springtime and Autumn in Blowing Rock are both cool and generally pleasant.

Rainfall is moderate; thunderstorms are occasional and rarely severe.

The biggest 24-hour temperature change recorded in North Carolina was recorded at Blowing Rock on 1 January 1979, yielding a temperature range of 63 degrees, from -8 °F to 55 °F.

Demographics

2020 census

As of the 2020 United States census, there were 1,376 people, 619 households, and 357 families residing in the town.

2000 census
As of the census of 2000, there were 1,418 people, 663 households, and 387 families residing in the town. The population density was 477.9 people per square mile (184.3/km2). There were 1,524 housing units at an average density of 513.6 per square mile (198.1/km2). The racial makeup of the town was 97.95% White, 0.35% African American, 0.21% Native American, 0.35% Asian, 0.07% from other races, and 1.06% from two or more races. Hispanic or Latino of any race were 0.63% of the population.

There were 663 households, of which 
 16.9% had children under the age of 18 living with them,
 52.3% were married couples living together,
 4.5% had a female householder with no husband present, and
 41.5% were non-families.
35.4% of all households were made up of individuals, and 14.6% had someone living alone who was 65 years of age or older. The average household size was 2.03 persons and the average family size was 2.59.

The population consists of 
 15.0% under the age of 18,
 4.9% from 18 to 24,
 20.0% from 25 to 44,
 34.1% from 45 to 64, and
 26.0% 65 years or older.
The median age was 51 years. For every 100 females, there were 86.8 males. For every 100 females age 18 and over, there were 80.4 males.

The median income for a household in the town was $54,271, and the median income for a family was $66,979. Males had a median income of $45,417 compared to $27,361 for females. The per capita income for the town was $34,294. About 2.9% of families and 9.1% of the population were below the poverty line, including 16.1% of those under age 18 and 6.5% of those age 65 or over.

Attractions

Due to the rock's shape and size, wind currents from the gorge often blow vertically, causing light objects to float upwards into the sky.

Blowing Rock is the site of Glen Burney Falls and Glen Marie Falls.

The Blowing Rock area was once fought over by the Cherokee and Catawba Native American tribes. According to legend, two lovers - one from each tribe - were walking near the rocks when the man received a notice to report to his village and go into battle. When his lover urged him to stay with her, he became so distraught that he threw himself off the blowing rock into the gorge. The woman prayed to the Great Spirit to return her lover, and the Spirit complied by sending a gust of wind which blew the man back up the cliff and landed him safely on the blowing rock itself. This story of course is fictional but it was used as a draw for the attraction. In the 1980s, a billboard in Wilkesboro for Blowing Rock showed two Indians holding hands, one standing on the rock and one "floating". Today "The Blowing Rock" is a tourist attraction and is known for its superb views of the surrounding Blue Ridge Mountains.

Another tourist attraction in Blowing Rock is the Tweetsie Railroad theme park, which is home to the only operational narrow-gauge railroad in North Carolina. Tweetsie Railroad operates a variety of narrow-gauge railroad equipment, including East Tennessee and Western North Carolina Railroad Locomotive No. 12, a steam locomotive built for the original ET&WNC Railroad in 1915. Other attractions in the Blowing Rock area include the elegant and historic Green Park Inn, Mystery Hill where visitors can experience a natural gravitational anomaly that causes objects suspended in mid air to take more force to move one direction than the other - Mystery Hill is also home to the Moon and Irene Mullins Arrowhead Collection with over 52,000 arrowheads on display, the Blowing Rock Country Club, and the Blowing Rock Art & History Museum.

On the nearby Blue Ridge Parkway is Moses Cone Memorial Park, which offers scenic views of the surrounding mountains. The park contains the Moses Cone Manor and Estate, and features two large lakes surrounded by forests and trails. These trails wind for miles, and were once carriage trails for the Cone family.

Annual festivals and events in Blowing Rock include the "Art in the Park" festival, a monthly summertime (May-Oct) event in downtown Blowing Rock where artists set up booths to sell their work to tourists; the Fourth of July festival and parade; Blowing Rock Winterfest in November; the Blue Ridge Wine and Food Festival in April; Christmas in the Park and Lighting of the Town festivities, including a Holiday Parade; the Symphony by the Lake at Chetola Resort; and the Blowing Rock Charity Horse Show which has been a tradition for 84 years. It is the longest continuously run horse show in the United States. The show features some of the best horse riders in the Eastern United States.

Media
The Blowing Rocket newspaper covers Blowing Rock. The newspaper is owned by Adams Publishing Group and is a sister publication of the Watauga Democrat in Boone.

Blowing Rock News is a digital-only news publication focused on Blowing Rock and its surrounding communities.

Infrastructure
The town is served by U.S. Highways 221 and 321 as well as the Blue Ridge Parkway. The two highways together lead north to Boone.

For other transportation facilities, consult Boone, North Carolina and Watauga County, North Carolina.

Notable people
Sarah Crouch, long-distance runner
Jan Karon, New York Times #1 bestselling author of the Mitford series of novels
Tyler Pennel, distance runner
Tom Robbins, author, recounted some early memories of Blowing Rock in Wild Ducks Flying Backward and in his 2014 "memoir" Tibetan Peach Pie
Cullie Tarleton, businessman and politician
Harry Foster Welch, radio and voice actor, best known for portraying the voice of Popeye in cartoons
Daniel Winkler, custom knife maker based in Blowing Rock

See also

 Blowing Rock (land feature)

References

External links

 
 Town website
  Blowing Rock Civic Association
 Blowing Rock Chamber of Commerce
 Blowing Rock Tourism Development Authority
 The Blowing Rocket newspaper

Towns in Caldwell County, North Carolina
Towns in Watauga County, North Carolina
Populated places established in 1889